Karchan may refer to:
 Karchan, Markazi
 Karchan, Qasr-e Qand, Sistan and Baluchestan Province